Madsen may refer to:

People
Madsen (surname)

Places
Canada
Madsen, Ontario, a community 
United States
Madsen, Wisconsin, an unincorporated community

Other
 Madsen (band), German rock band
 DISA (company), Dansk Industri Syndikat A/S, is also known as Madsen, after its founder
 Madsen machine gun, Danish light machine gun/squad automatic weapon
 Madsen-Saetter machine gun, Danish general purpose machine gun
 Madsen M-50, Danish submachine gun
 Madsen 20 mm anti-aircraft cannon, Danish type of machine cannon